Dolno Količani is a village in the municipality of Studeničani, North Macedonia.

History 
The inhabitants are descendants of the Karamanoğulları tribe from nowdays Turkey, long before the Ottoman invasion of the Balkans

Demographics  

Dolno Količani has traditionally been inhabited by a Turkish population, inhabitants there are considering them self as Ethnical Turks.  The mother tongue of Dolno Količani inhabitants and of daily communication is Macedonian and Turkish for the oldest residents and the younger population.
The oldest living people in the village are witnessing and telling that previously under the Bulgarian fascist occupation, the fascist army came to the village and forced them not to talk on their native language which is Turkish language in that time, and they punished everyone who did spoke Turkish language.

Meaning and origin of the name  

The name of the village, Aşağı Koliçan (Dolno Kolichani) is given by then Ottoman soldiers - When they came first to the than small inhabited village by the Karamanoğulları tribesmen the people welcomed them well and with open arms/hands as the term Koliçan comes from the Turkish two words - "Kol" (Arm) and "Açan" (Open) which means "Open Arms".

In the village there is one first school named after the founder of Turkey and former Turkish president Mustafa Kemal Atatürk and the education is on Turkish Language.
At the centre of the village there is also one mosque.
An ambulance near the village and 3 public vintage water fountains.

According to the 2021 census, the village had a total of 1.831 inhabitants. Ethnic groups in the village include:

Turks 1.739
Albanians 12
Bosniaks 11
Others 69

References

Villages in Studeničani Municipality
Macedonian Muslim villages
Turkish communities in North Macedonia